Port Durnford (sometimes Port Dunford) may refer to:

Port Durnford, a town in uMhlathuze Local Municipality, KwaZulu-Natal, South Africa

See also
Punta Durnford